Sue Sweeney (born 22 September) is an English comedienne, radio presenter, actress and singer. She is best known for her work on BBC Radio and Durham On Air.

Life
Sweeney is best known in the North East of England. She was trained as a singer from a young age and toured around the UK in various tribute bands. She has two daughters, Jade and journalist Rachel Sweeney. She is married to Ian Sweeney. She is most famous for presenting on BBC Radio Newcastle presenting various shows for over 20 years until 2019.

Alongside presenting music programmes on BBC Radio Newcastle and BBC Radio Tees, Sue is now a presenter on Durham On Air, hosting the evening show on Monday and Wednesday.

Sweeney is a comedienne who won The North East Comedy Award in 1998, the first woman to do so. In 2009, she released comedy DVD 'She's A Tonic' and 'The Diva Of Durham' in 2011.

In 2016, she took part in a special event in which she unveiled the tomosynthesis machine at Queen Elizabeth Hospital in Gateshead.

She was previously a patron for charity FACT (Fighting All Cancers Together). In 2022, she joined St Cuthberts Hospice as part of their Win Win Lottery.

In 2021, Sue was awarded the Rotary International Foundation medal for better understanding and friendly relations among people of the world.

In 2022, she was announced as one of Durham City AFC's 'Celebrity Citizens', helping the club to re-connect with the Durham community.

In November 2022, she hosted Durham’s Christmas light switch on with Joe McElderry.

References

External links
 
 

English television personalities
English television presenters
English radio DJs
Living people
Year of birth missing (living people)